Billboard publishes annual lists of songs based on chart performance over the course of a year based on Nielsen Broadcast Data Systems and SoundScan information. For 2010, the list for the top 100 Billboard Hot 100 Year-End songs was published on December 8, calculated with data from December 5, 2009 to November 27, 2010. At the number-one position was Kesha's "Tik Tok", which stayed atop the Hot 100 for nine weeks. This achievement made Kesha the first female artist in the history of the chart to top the Year-End Hot 100 with a debut single.

The list is also notable for being one of five Billboard Year-End lists that featured 14 songs that appeared in the previous year (in this case 2009's) repeat onto to this list. The highest being Jay Z's "Empire State of Mind", which made it on to 2009's list at number 62 and repeat higher at number 20 in 2010's. Only four more year-end list would repeat the same feat, that being 1997, 2016, 2018 and 2022.

See also 

 2010 in American music
 List of Billboard Hot 100 number-one singles of 2010
 List of Billboard Hot 100 top-ten singles in 2010

References

United States Hot 100 Year-End
Billboard charts